The Aerotécnica AC-12 Pepo is a Spanish two-seat light helicopter manufactured in 1956 by Aerotécnica.

Design and development 
Aerotécnica AC-12 was designed by Jean Cantinieau and like other Cantinieau designs featured a distinctive "spine" above the fuselage pod that carried the engine ahead of the rotor assembly. Development costs were borne by the Spanish government, and the first of two prototypes took to the air on 20 July 1954.

Operational history
Twelve (including two prototypes) were ordered for the Spanish Air Force where they served for three years under the designation EC-XZ-2.

Operators 

 Spanish Air Force

Specifications

Gallery

See also

References

Notes

Bibliography

Apostolo, Giorgio. The Illustrated Encyclopedia of Helicopters. New York: Bonanza Books, 1984. .
 Jane, Fred Thomas. Jane's Fighting Craft: Janes's Encyclopedia of Aviation, 5 Vols. in One. London: Gramercy Books, 1989. . 
 Simpson, Rod W. Airlife's Helicopters & Rotorcraft. London: Airlife Pub Limited, 1998. . 
 Taylor, John W. R. Jane's All The World's Aircraft 1961–62. London: Sampson Low, Marston & Company, 1961.

1950s Spanish helicopters
1950s Spanish military utility aircraft
AC-12
Single-engined piston helicopters